VIRtual Training and Environments (VIRTE) was an Office of Naval Research Science and Technology program from 2002 to 2007 led by CDR Dylan Schmorrow. It was funded under the Capable Manpower Future Naval Capability (FNC) and produced research in Virtual Environments. The VIRTE program was divided into three related demonstrations. Demo 1 developed virtual simulators for the LCAC, the EFV, and a helicopter. Demo 2 concentrated on technologies to support Immersive Infantry Training. Demo 3 developed laptop based simulators for a wide variety of USMC platforms and was fielded as part of the Deployable Virtual Training Environment (DVTE).

External links 
I/ITSEC 2003 Paper

Military exercises and wargames
United States Navy organization